Thomas Jefferson Edwards (October 15, 1922 – October 23, 1969) was an American singer and songwriter. His most successful record was the multi-million-selling song "It's All in the Game", becoming the first African-American to reach No. 1 on the Billboard Hot 100.

Career
Born in Richmond, Virginia, Edwards was an R&B singer most remembered for his 1958 hit "It's All in the Game", which appeared in the list of Billboard number-one singles of 1958. He sang his hit song on The Ed Sullivan Show, on September 14, 1958. The song was composed by then-future U.S. Vice-President Charles G. Dawes in 1911 as "Melody in A Major" with lyrics written in 1951 by Carl Sigman. Edwards originally recorded and charted the song in 1951, but it  climbed to only no. 18. The better-known 1958 version was on the same record label (MGM) and was backed by the same orchestra leader (Leroy Holmes), but with a different arrangement more suited to the rock and roll-influenced style of the time. As well as topping the U.S. Billboard Hot 100, the song also got to number one on the R&B chart and the UK Singles Chart. The single sold over 3.5 million copies globally, earning gold disc status. The gold disc was presented in November 1958. His second biggest hit was his 1959 re-recording of "Please, Mr. Sun" (written by Ramon Martin Getzov and Sid Frank), which reached No. 11. Another of Edwards' hits was "Love Is All We Need" which reached No. 15 on the Billboard Hot 100.

"That Chick's Too Young to Fry", written by Edwards, was a sizable hit for Louis Jordan. Edwards began recording for the Top label in 1949. When MGM heard his demo of it, they gave him a recording contract.

Although Edwards recorded a number of other songs, none came close to achieving the same level of success, though several of his songs later became hits for other artists, such as "A Fool Such as I" by Elvis Presley, "It's All in the Game" by Cliff Richard and the Four Tops (Eddie Holman's version of it was the B-side of his hit "Hey There Lonely Girl"), "Please Love Me Forever" by Cathy Jean and the Roommates (1961) and by Bobby Vinton (1967), and "Morning Side of the Mountain" recorded by Donny and Marie Osmond.

On October 23, 1969, Edwards died at the age of 47 from massive internal hemorrhaging due to esophageal varices linked to cirrhosis of the liver, per his death certificate. He is interred at the Quioccasin Baptist Church Cemetery in Henrico, Virginia. His headstone says he was born on October 15, 1922 but his death certificate says October 12, 1926. The 1930 census indicates that his correct birth year is 1922. The informant was his sister, Buena.

Edwards received a Virginia Highway Marker in 2008, erected near Pemberton Elementary School, off Quioccasin Road, in Henrico County. In July 2008, Richmond mayor L. Douglas Wilder signed a proclamation declaring October 15, 2008 "Tommy Edwards Day".

In September 2012, Cherry Red Records label Shout issued a 2-CD collection of Edwards's work, entitled It's All in the Game (The MGM Recordings 1958–1960), which comprised his first four MGM albums and singles from the two years following that single's huge success.

Country and western crossover album
In 1961, Edwards broke new ground by releasing a studio album entitled Golden Country Hits. His album of country interpretations predated Ray Charles' Modern Sounds in Country and Western Music and featured covers of some of the same song choices, including "You Don't Know Me", a popular crossover ballad by country songwriter Cindy Walker.

Partial discography

Albums
Tommy Edwards Sings—Regent MG 6096 (Mono only) -- 1958
It's All in the Game—MGM E (Mono)/SE (Stereo) 3732–1958
For Young Lovers—MGM E/SE 3670–1959
You Started Me Dreaming—MGM E/SE 3805–1959
Tommy Edwards—Lion L 70120 (Mono only) -- 1959
Tommy Edwards in Hawaii—MGM E/SE 3838–1960
Stardust—MGM E/SE 4020–1960
Step Out Singing—MEM E/SE 3822–1960
Tommy Edwards' Greatest Hits—MGM E/SE 3884–1961
Tommy Edwards Sings Golden Country Hits—MGM E/SE 3959–1961
Soft Strings and Two Guitars—MGM E/SE 4060–1962
The Very Best of Tommy Edwards—MGM E/SE 4141–1963
Tommy Edwards—Metro M (Mono)/MS (Stereo) 511–1965

Singles

Production notes
The recording "Honestly and Truly" is only heard on compact disc in mono, because the original stereo master tape was either lost or destroyed.

The recording "Take These Chains from My Heart" is heard on compact disc in re-channeled stereo because, as with the above song, the original stereo master was lost or destroyed.

These recordings were issued on the MGM record label unless otherwise noted.

"It's All in the Game" (1958 version) was produced by Harry Myerson. He is assumed to be the producer for all tracks from this point forward, although this cannot be confirmed.

The orchestra was conducted and the arrangements were made on all records by LeRoy Holmes.

Television appearances 
Sing It Again (1951)
Perry Como's Kraft Music Hall (1951–1952)
Songs for Sale (1952)
The Ed Sullivan Show (1958)
The Arthur Murray Party (1958)

See also
List of artists who reached number one on the Hot 100 (U.S.)
List of artists who reached number one on the Billboard R&B chart
List of artists who reached number one on the UK Singles Chart
List of artists who reached number one on the Australian singles chart
List of deaths in rock and roll
List of number-one rhythm and blues hits (United States)

References

External links
Biography at Encyclopedia Virginia
Oldies.com biography of Tommy Edwards
Fansite with discography and song lyrics

1922 births
1969 deaths
American rhythm and blues singers
American male pop singers
Musicians from Richmond, Virginia
MGM Records artists
20th-century African-American male singers